Krakės Eldership is a Lithuanian eldership, located in the northwestern part of Kėdainiai District Municipality.

Eldership was created from the Krakės selsovet in 1993.

Geography
The territory of Krakės Eldership is located in the East Samogitian Plateau. Relief is mostly flat, in some places slightly undulated. Altitudes reach 100–105 meters above the sea level.

 Rivers: Šušvė with its tributaries (Ažytė, Pečiupė, Pilsupys, Skerdūmė), Smilga with its tributaries (Jaugila, Smilgaitis, Tranys). 
 Lakes and ponds: Baublys, Rukai Lake, Jaugiliai Lake, Rimkai Lake, Plinkaigalis Lake, part of the Angiriai Reservoir, Skerdūmė Pond. 
 Forests: Krakės-Dotnuva Forest, Josvainiai Forest, Lapkalnys-Paliepiai Forest.
 Protected areas: Pajieslys Geomorphological Sanctuary, Pašušvys Landscape Sanctuary, Smilga Landscape Sanctuary, Baublys Ornitological Sanctuary, Vosbučiai Botanical-Zoological Sanctuary, Zembiškis Forest Botanical Sanctuary.

Places of interest
Catholic church of St. Matthew in Krakės, wooden Catholic church of St. Mary in Pajieslys
Hillforts of Vosbučiai, Pilsupiai, Ambraziūnai and Plinkaigalis
Manor relics in Pašušvys
Barkūniškiai Watermill
Skinderiškis Dendrological Park
Plinkaigalis ancient burial place
Piluspiai and Vosbučiai outcrops
Meironiškiai stones
Krakės historical town
Krakės Jewish cemetery
Ancient cemeteries of Pališkėliai, Plaukiai and Rezgiai

Populated places 
Following settlements are located in the Krakės Eldership (as for 2011 census):

Towns: Krakės
Villages: Ambraziūnai · Antežeriai · Antkalnis · Apirubiai · Apušrotas · Aukštuoliukai · Ažytėnai · Ąžuolytė · Bagotiškiai · Barkūnėliai · Barkūniškis · Beržytė · Černovka · Čystapolis · Daržbalys · Degimai · Deveikiškėliai · Deveikiškiai · Digraičiai · Diksiai · Donava · Dovydiškiai · Gaideliai · Gersonė · Girynė · Girvainiai · Gudaičiai · Guptilčiai · Jankūnai · Jaugiliai · Jaugilka · Jurgaičiai · Keturkiemiai · Krakės · Krymas · Kukoriškiai · Lenčiai · Liubokinė · Maconiai · Mąstautai · Medininkai · Meironiškėliai · Meironiškiai · Mikniūnai · Milvydai · Mumaičiai · Norkūnai · Pajieslys ·Pakarkliai · Palainiškiai · Pališkėliai · Pališkiai · Parezgys · Paropėlis · Paskardžiai · Paskerdūmiukas · Paskerdūmys · Pašušvys · Patranys · Peštiniukai · Pilsupėliai · Pilsupiai · Plaukiai · Plinkaigalis ·Purvaičiai · Rėguliai · Rezgiai · Rezgiukai · Rimkai · Rukai· Simoniškiai · Skirgailinė · Slabada · Sutkūnai · Šilainiai · Šmotiškėliai · Šmotiškiai · Špitolpievis · Šulaičiai ·  Šulcava · Tauginiškiai · Trakai · Ustronė · Užvarčiai · Vailainiai · Vantainiai · Vytautinė · Vosbučiai · Zembiškis · Žalioji · Žebgraužiai · Žitaičiai 
Hamlets: Girlaukis

References

Elderships in Kėdainiai District Municipality